Parliamentary elections were held in Latvia on 3 and 4 October 1931. The Latvian Social Democratic Workers' Party remained the largest party, winning 21 of the 100 seats. They were the last elections held under the Constitution of Latvia before the 1934 coup d'état and the last competitive elections held under Latvian law until 1993.

Electoral system
For the elections the country was divided into five constituencies, electing a total of 100 MPs using proportional representation. The list system used was made flexible, as voters were able to cross out candidates' names and replace them with names from other lists, a system 35% of voters took advantage of. Although 103 lists registered for the election, the number of competing lists dropped from 66 to 46.

Results

References

Latvia
Parliamentary
Parliamentary elections in Latvia